

External links 

 https://www.supremecourt.gov/opinions/slipopinions.aspx

Lists of 2014 term United States Supreme Court opinions